Mark Lovell (27 March 1960 – 12 July 2003) was a British rally driver. He won the 1986 British Rally Championship in a Ford RS200 Group B, the 1987 and 1988 Irish Tarmac Rally Championship, the 1988 International Dutch Rally Drivers' Championship and the 2001 SCCA ProRally Drivers' Championship in the United States. He also won the 2003 Pikes Peak Rally only two weeks before his death.

When the Subaru Impreza WRX and the Mitsubishi Lancer Evolution were introduced in 2002 and 2003 to the United States, both cars created more interest in the sport of rallying. Subaru and subsequently Mitsubishi entered the US Pro Rally championship with factory teams; Mark Lovell was the lead driver for the Subaru / Prodrive team, with Americans Karl Scheible (2002) and Ramana Lagemann (2003) as teammates.

Mark and his co-driver Roger Freeman were both killed in July 2003 during the Oregon Trail Rally when their Works ProRally Subaru Impreza WRX left the road and struck a tree at high speed shortly after the start of the first stage.

A memorial page for both Mark and Roger has been set up, which includes many photographs of the team and events at both the Pikes Peak and Oregon Trail Pro Rallies.

Titles

 RACMSA British Rally Championship – 1986 winner, with Roger Freeman in a Ford RS200 Group B.
 Irish Tarmac Rally Championship – 1987 winner, with Roger Freeman in a Ford Sierra RS Cosworth, and 1988 winner, with Terry Harryman in a Ford Sierra RS Cosworth.
 Dutch Rally Championship – 1988
 SCCA ProRally Championship – 2001, with Steve Turvey & Mike Kidd in a Subaru Impreza WRX Works car

Awards
 Autosport Magazine's British Rally Driver of the Year, 1985

External links
 Memorial page
 Biography on RallyBase

1960 births
2003 deaths
English rally drivers
Racing drivers who died while racing
Sports deaths in Oregon